Nina is the fourth studio album by Croatian recording artist Nina Badrić, released in 2000 by Croatia Records.

Track listing

References 

Nina Badrić albums
2000 albums